process.h is a C header file which contains function declarations and macros used in working with threads and processes. Most C compilers that target DOS, Windows 3.1x, Win32, OS/2, Novell NetWare or DOS extenders supply this header and the library functions in their C library. Neither the header file nor most of the functions are defined by either the ANSI/ISO C standard or by POSIX.

History
Microsoft's version of the file dates back to at least 1985, according to its copyright statement. An early reference to the file was in a post on the net.micro.pc usenet on Oct-26-1986. The compiler used was Microsoft C compiler version 3.0.
The Lattice C compiler version 3.30 (Aug-24-1988) did not have such a header file, but offered similar functions.
Borland provided the header in their Turbo C compiler version 2.01.
The C Ware-Personal C compiler version 1.2c (June 1989) had only the ANSI headers.

Functions

Constants

Implementations 
Given the fact there is no standard on which to base the implementation, the functions declared by process.h differ, depending on the compiler in use. Below is a list of compilers which provide process.h.

 DJGPP
 OpenWatcom,
 Digital Mars
 MinGW
 Microsoft Visual C++
 Borland Turbo C, 2.0 and later
 Lcc32
 QNX Neutrino QCC 6.x

Differences 
Another aspect that might vary is the combined length of exec* and spawn* parameters.
 Delorie DJGPP: does not have such a limit.
 Digital Mars: the maximum is 128 bytes; nothing is stated about the ending '\0' character.
 Microsoft cl: the argument list for the new process must not exceed 1024 bytes.

References

External links
Digital Mars _exec reference

 
C (programming language) headers